This is a list of androgen esters, including esters (as well as ethers) of natural androgens like testosterone and dihydrotestosterone (DHT) and synthetic anabolic–androgenic steroids (AAS) like nandrolone (19-nortestosterone).

Esters of natural AAS

Testosterone esters

Marketed
Many esters of testosterone have been marketed, including the following major esters:

 Testosterone caproate (component of Omnadren and Triormon Depositum)
 Testosterone cypionate (Depo-Testosterone, numerous others)
 Testosterone decanoate (component of Sustanon 250)
 Testosterone enanthate (Delatestryl, numerous others) (component of Testoviron Depot)
 Testosterone isobutyrate (Agovirin-Depot, Perandren M, Testocryst, Virex-Cryst; component of Femandren M/Folivirin)
 Testosterone isocaproate (component of Omnadren, Sustanon 100, and Sustanon 250)
 Testosterone phenylpropionate (component of Omnadren, Sustanon 100, and Sustanon 250)
 Testosterone propionate (Testoviron, numerous others) (component of Omnadren, Sustanon 100, Sustanon 250, and Testoviron Depot)
 Testosterone undecanoate (Aveed, Andriol, Nebido, Jatenzo, numerous others)

And the following less commonly used esters:

 Testosterone acetate (Aceto-Sterandryl, Aceto-Testoviron, Amolisin, Androtest A, Deposteron, Farmatest, Perandrone A)
 Testosterone cyclohexylpropionate (Andromar, Femolone, Telipex Retard; component of Trioestrine Retard)
 Testosterone enantate benzilic acid hydrazone (component of Climacteron)
 Testosterone furoate (Furotest)
 Testosterone hexahydrobenzoate (Sterandryl Retard; component of Trinestril AP)
 Testosterone hexahydrobenzylcarbonate (Lontanyl)
 Testosterone hexyloxyphenylpropionate (Andradurin)
 Testosterone ketolaurate (Androdurin; component of Testosid-Depot and Klimanosid R-Depot)
 Testosterone nicotinate (Bolfortan, Linobol)
 Testosterone phenylacetate (Perandren, Androject)
 Testosterone phosphate (Telipex Aquosum)
 Testosterone undecylenate (component of Durasteron and Triolandren)
 Testosterone valerate (component of Deposterona and Triolandren)

Never marketed
The following major testosterone ester has not been marketed:

 Testosterone buciclate (20 Aet-1, CDB-1781) – a very long-acting testosterone ester that was under development but ultimately did not reach the market

And the following less commonly known testosterone esters have also not been marketed:

 Polytestosterone phloretin phosphate
 Testosterone 17β-(1-((5-(aminosulfonyl)-2-pyridinyl)carbonyl)--proline) (EC586)
 Testosterone acetate butyrate
 Testosterone acetate propionate
 Testosterone benzoate
 Testosterone butyrate
 Testosterone diacetate
 Testosterone dipropionate
 Testosterone formate
 Testosterone isovalerate
 Testosterone palmitate
 Testosterone phenylbutyrate
 Testosterone stearate
 Testosterone succinate
 Testosterone sulfate

Dihydrotestosterone esters

Marketed
Several esters of dihydrotestosterone (DHT; androstanolone, stanolone) have also been marketed, including the following:

 Androstanolone benzoate (Ermalone-Amp, Hermalone, Sarcosan)
 Androstanolone enantate (Anaboleen Depot)
 Androstanolone propionate (Pesomax)
 Androstanolone valerate (Apeton)

Never marketed
The following esters of DHT have not been marketed:

 Dihydrotestosterone acetate
 Dihydrotestosterone butyrate
 Dihydrotestosterone formate
 Dihydrotestosterone undecanoate

Testifenon (chlorphenacyl DHT ester) is a nitrogen mustard ester of DHT that was developed as a cytostatic antineoplastic agent but was never marketed.

Esters of other natural AAS

Marketed
The following esters of other natural AAS have been marketed:

 Androstenediol dipropionate (Bisexovister, Bisexovis, Ginandrin, Stenandiol)
 Prasterone enantate (DHEA enantate) (Gynodian Depot (in combination with estradiol valerate))
 Prasterone sulfate (DHEA sulfate) (Astenile, Mylis, Teloin)

Never marketed
And the following have not been marketed:

 Androstenediol 3β-acetate
 Androstenediol 3β-acetate 17β-benzoate
 Androstenediol 17β-acetate
 Androstenediol diacetate

Sturamustine is a nitrosourea ester of dehydroepiandrosterone (DHEA) that was developed as a cytostatic antineoplastic agent but was never marketed.

Ethers of natural AAS

Marketed
Although not esters, the following ethers of natural AAS have been marketed as well:

 Cloxotestosterone acetate (Caprosem) – the 17-O-chloral hemiacetal acetate ether of testosterone

Never marketed
And the following have not been marketed:

 Cloxotestosterone – the 17-O-chloral hemiacetal ether of testosterone
 Silandrone (SC-16148) – the 17-O-trimethylsilyl ether of testosterone

Esters of synthetic AAS

Methandriol esters

Marketed
 Methandriol bisenanthoyl acetate (Notandron-Depot)
 Methandriol dipropionate (Arbolic, Durabolic, Or-Bolic, Probolik, Protabolin)
 Methandriol propionate (Metilbisexovis)

Never marketed
 Methandriol diacetate

Nandrolone esters

Marketed
Many esters of the synthetic AAS nandrolone (19-nortestosterone) have been marketed, including the following major esters:

 Nandrolone decanoate (Deca-Durabolin, others)
 Nandrolone phenylpropionate (Durabolin, others)

And the following less commonly used esters:

 Nandrolone caproate (Anabolin Depot)
 Nandrolone cyclohexanecarboxylate (Nor-Durandron, Norlongandron)
 Nandrolone cyclohexylpropionate (Andol, Fherbolico, Megabolin, Megabolin Retar, Pluropon, Proteron-Depot, Sanabolicum)
 Nandrolone cypionate (Anabo, Depo-Nortestonate, Dynabol, Nortestrionate, Pluropon, Sterocrinolo)
 Nandrolone furylpropionate (Demelon)
 Nandrolone hexyloxyphenylpropionate (Anador, Anadur, Anadurine)
 Nandrolone hydrogen succinate (Anabolico, Menidrabol)
 Nandrolone laurate (Clinibolin, Fortadex, Laurabolin)
 Nandrolone propionate (Anabolicus, Nor-Anabol, Nortesto, Norbyol 19, Pondus, Testobolin)
 Nandrolone sulfate (Keratyl, Nandrol, Nandain, Colirio Ocul Nandrol)
 Nandrolone undecanoate (Dynabolin, Dynabolon, Psychobolan)

Never marketed
The following nandrolone esters exist but were never marketed:

 Bolmantalate (nandrolone 17β-adamantoate)
 Nandrolone acetate
 Nandrolone benzoate
 Nandrolone cyclotate
 Nandrolone enanthate
 Nandrolone formate
 Nandrolone nonanoate

LS-1727 is a nitrosocarbamate ester of nandrolone that was developed as a cytostatic antineoplastic agent but was never marketed.

Trenbolone esters

Marketed
A few esters of the synthetic AAS trenbolone have been marketed, including the following esters:

 Trenbolone acetate (Revalor, Finaplix, Finajet)
 Trenbolone hexahydrobenzylcarbonate (Parabolan, Hexabolan)

Never marketed
The following trenbolone esters exist but were never marketed:

 Trenbolone enanthate
 Trenbolone undecanoate

Esters of other synthetic AAS

Marketed
Many esters of other synthetic AAS have been marketed as well, including the following:

 Bolandiol dipropionate (Anabiol, Storinal)
 Bolazine capronate (bolazine caproate) (Roxilon Inject)
 Boldenone acetate (Equilon 100)
 Boldenone cypionate (Equilon 100)
 Boldenone propionate (Equilon 100)
 Boldenone undecylenate (boldenone undecenoate) (Boldane, Equilon 100, Equipoise, Parenabol, Vebonol, others)
 Clostebol acetate (Macrobin, Steranabol, Alfa-Trofodermin, Megagrisevit)
 Clostebol caproate (Macrobin-Depot)
 Clostebol propionate (Yonchlon)
 Drostanolone propionate (Masteron, Drolban, Masteril, Mastisol, Metormon, Permastril)
 Metenolone acetate (Primobolan, Primobolan S, Primonabol, Nibal)
 Metenolone enantate (Primobolan Depot)
 Norclostebol acetate (Anabol 4-19)
 Oxabolone cipionate (Steranabol Depo, Steranabol Ritardo)
 Propetandrol (norethandrolone 3β-propionate) (Solevar)
 Stenbolone acetate (Stenobolone, Anatrofin)

Never marketed
Whereas the following have not been marketed:

 11β-Methyl-19-nortestosterone dodecylcarbonate
 Dimethandrolone buciclate
 Dimethandrolone dodecylcarbonate
 Dimethandrolone undecanoate
 Mesterolone cypionate
 Nisterime acetate
 Trestolone acetate
 Trestolone enantate

Ethers of synthetic AAS

Marketed
Although not esters, the following ethers of synthetic AAS have been marketed as well:

 Mepitiostane (Thioderon) – 17β-(1-methyloxycyclopentyl) ether of epitiostanol
 Methyltestosterone 3-hexyl ether (Androgenol, Enoltestovis, Enoltestovister) – 3-hexyl enol ether of methyltestosterone
 Penmesterol (penmestrol) (Pandrocine, Testopan) – 3-cyclopentyl enol ether of methyltestosterone
 Quinbolone (Anabolicum, Anabolvis) – 17β-cyclopentenyl enol ether of boldenone (Δ1-testosterone)

Never marketed
And the following have not been marketed:

 Mesabolone – 17β-(1-methyloxycyclohexyl) ether of 1-testosterone (dihydroboldenone)
 Methoxydienone (methoxygonadiene) – 3-methyl ether of 17-dehydro-18-methyl-19-nor-δ2,5(10)-testosterone
 Prostanozol – 17β-tetrahydropyran ether of the 17α-demethylated analogue of stanozolol

See also
 List of androgens/anabolic steroids
 List of estrogen esters
 List of progestogen esters
 List of corticosteroid esters

References

Androgen esters
Androgens and anabolic steroids
Prodrugs